Diego Brochero (died 30 July 1625, Madrid) was a Spanish seaman originally from Salamanca.

He took part in the 2nd Spanish Armada and the 3rd Spanish Armada.

In 1601 he was an admiral in a Spanish force and oversaw fifteen ships. He was also sent to land troops in Ireland.

See also
 Siege of Kinsale

Sources
Fernández Duro, Cesáreo. La Armada Española desde la unión de los reinos de Castilla y Aragón, Museo Naval, Madrid, 1973.

Spanish admirals
1625 deaths
People from Salamanca
People of the Nine Years' War